Burying Brian is a New Zealand television miniseries produced by Eyeworks Touchdown which premiered on Television New Zealand's TV One on 2 July 2008, and ran for 6 episodes. The series is about Jodie and her three female friends. At the beginning of the first episode, Jodie's husband Brian dies during a domestic dispute. Jodie believes that she may go to jail for his murder, but her friends convince her not to report the death, but instead to bury the body and make it appear that he has run off with another woman.

Although the series was a ratings success, no further episodes were made after the first season.

Cast and characters
Jodie Dorday as Jodie Welch
Rebecca Hobbs as Gerri Marchand
Carrie McLaughlin as Theresa Donnelly
Ingrid Park as Denise Crowley
Craig Hall as Pete Donnelly
Shane Cortese as Brian Welch
Josh Leys as Josh Welch
Ruby Love as Kendall Welch
Scott Wills – Warren Crowley
Hannah Marshall – Kimberley

Episodes

References

External links
Television New Zealand page
Nga Taonga Sound & Vision

2000s New Zealand television series
2000s television miniseries
2008 New Zealand television series debuts
2008 New Zealand television series endings
English-language television shows
New Zealand comedy-drama television series
New Zealand television miniseries
Television shows funded by NZ on Air
TVNZ 1 original programming